Dhanus is a genus of pseudoscorpions in the family Ideoroncidae. They are found in Asia, between Malaysia to the east and Iran and Soqotra to the west. It includes the following species:
Dhanus afghanicus
Dhanus doveri, synonymous with Dhanus sumatranus
Dhanus hashimi
Dhanus indicus
Dhanus pohli
Dhanus socotraensis
Dhanus taitii
Dhanus tioman

The species Dhanus siamensis has been recently reclassified in a new genus of its own called Sironcus.

References 

Pseudoscorpion genera
Neobisioidea